Jhoomer is a 1959 Pakistani film directed by Masood Parvez, producer by Khwaja Khurshid Anwar who wrote the screenplay also. The music composition was also done by Anwar and lyrics by Tanvir Naqvi. It stars Musarrat Nazir, Allauddin, Sudhir and Naeem Hashmi.

Cast 

 Musarrat Nazir
 Sudhir
 Allauddin
 Laila
 Ghulam Mohammad
 Diljeet Mirza
 Azuri
 Rakhsi
 Naeem Hashmi

Soundtrack
The music of the film was composed by Khwaja Khurshid Anwar and lyrics were written by Tanvir Naqvi. The film features following songs:

 Gham Hum Ko Diya, Ghamkhwaron Ne, Dil Tor Diya Dildaro Ne by Naheed Niazi
 Bhuji Bhuji Si Roshni Aur Hum by Irene Perveen
 Chali Ray, Chali Ray, Mein To  Des Piya Ke Chali Ray by Naheed Niazi
 Ik Albela Pardesi Dil Mein Sama Gya Hai by Naheed Niazi
 Phoonk Do Bijliyo, Aa Ke Mera Jahan, Hai Yeh Aisa Chammam by Munir Hussain
 Dulhaniya, Roti Matt Jana, Apnay Aansoo, Apni Ahein by Naheed Niazi, Irene Perveen and chorus

References

External links 
 

1959 films
Pakistani black-and-white films
1950s Urdu-language films
Films directed by Masood Parvez
Urdu-language Pakistani films
Films scored by Khurshid Anwar